John Henry Wise (July 19, 1868 – August 12, 1937) was a Native Hawaiian politician, businessman, religious leader, and educator of Hawaii. In his youth, he became the first Native Hawaiian to play college football with the Oberlin Yeomen football team while he attended theology school at Oberlin College. During his political career in the Hawaii Territorial Legislature, he helped pass the Hawaiian Homelands Act of 1921. In later life, he served as an instructor of Hawaiian language at the Kamehameha Schools and the University of Hawaii.

Early life
He was born July 19, 1868, at Kapaʻau, Kohala, on the island of Hawaii. His parents were Julius A. Wise, a German settler from Hamburg, and Rebecca Nāwaʻa, a Native Hawaiian. He was educated at the Hilo Boarding School and became a part of the inaugural class of the Kamehameha School for Boys where he played left field for the Kamehameha Nine baseball team.

Oberlin College

From 1890 to 1893, he attended theology school at Oberlin College where he became the first Native Hawaiian to play college football, on the college's first football team. Coach John Heisman found him in searching for a guard. He was considered the team's best lineman. Wise also played at fullback, and scored a touchdown in the close loss to Michigan in 1892. Noted for his immense strength, he was reportedly "able to run with three men on his back without noticing the extra weight".

Career in Hawaii
After graduating school, he returned home in June 1893. The monarchy under Queen Liliuokalani had been overthrown and a new Provisional Government (later the Republic of Hawaii) had taken its place. The Hawaiian Evangelical Association which had funded Wise's continental education supported the anti-monarchists while Wise became a Royalist. He worked for a time as pastor of Kamakuamauloa Church. In January 1895, he took part in the unsuccessful counter-revolution led by Robert William Wilcox against the Republic of Hawaii. Wise was arrested and tried for misprision of treason. On his February 5 trial, he pled guilty to the charges, refused to give evidence against other conspirators and was sentenced to three years in jail. Among the last group of political prisoners released, he was pardoned the following year by President Sanford B. Dole.

After the annexation of Hawaii to United States, Wise became a founding member of the Democratic Party of Hawaii and served as a delegate, with former Hawaiian royal Prince David Kawānanakoa, to the 1900 Democratic National Convention in Kansas City, Missouri, in which William Jennings Bryan was nominated. He supported the Democrats because of the association of the party with President Grover Cleveland who had sympathized with the Royalist cause in 1893. Wise worked as a Hawaiian language interpreter for the 1901 inaugural Hawaii Territorial Legislature, established after the Hawaiian Organic Act.

Wise switched party lines, becoming a member of the Republican Party of Hawaii in 1905, and attended the 1912 Republican National Convention. He served on the Hawaii Territorial Legislature as a clerk on the House of Representatives and the Hawaii Territorial Senate for multiple years. In 1919, he was elected and served a four-year term Senator from the Third District.
He joined Prince Jonah Kūhiō Kalanianaʻole, the Congressional delegate from Hawaii, in support of the passage of the Homelands Act of 1921. Despite Wise's and Kūhiō's wishes, the Act contained high blood-quantum requirements, and leased land instead of granting it fee-simple, creating a perpetual government institution. In between his political career, he worked as a contractor on the island of Hawaii and helped translated Hawaiian legends for the Bishop Museum. In December 1923, President Calvin Coolidge appointed Wise as director of prohibition enforcement during the prohibition era.

He retired from politics in 1925 and briefly lived on Molokai, farming taro and raising pigs. In 1926, Wise began teaching Hawaiian language at Kamehameha Schools and later at the University of Hawaii, becoming the second professor of Hawaiian language after Frederick William Beckley. He taught until 1934. During this period, he and Kamehameha Schools president Frank Midkiff co-authored a Hawaiian language textbook, A First Course in Hawaiian Language. He also helped revitalized Hawaiian culture through his membership in Hawaiian civic organizations such as the Royal Order of Kamehameha I and the Hawaiian Civic Clubs, both which he helped Prince Kūhiō reorganize or founded, and the Hale O Nā Aliʻi O Hawaiʻi.

Death and legacy
On December 20, 1897, he married Lois Kawai (1882–1919) at Waimea. They had ten children: Muriel (Lyons), Lois, Rebecca (Boozer), William, Ella (Harrison), Nani, John Henry Jr., Jonah Kuhio, Daniel, and Tepa.
In 1920, he married Edith McDowell, a newspaper correspondent he met in Washington, DC.

He died on August 12, 1937, of pneumonia, and was buried at the Oahu Cemetery. After his death, the University of Hawaii renamed the school's athletic field John Henry Wise Field in his honor. 
The field was renamed to Bachman Lawn at a later date; it now is situated at the corner of Dole Street and University Avenue near an amphitheater. 
In 2012, Ronald William, Jr. wrote To Raise a Voice in Praise: The Revivalist Mission of John Henry Wise, 1889–1896 about the early periods of Wise's life.

References

Bibliography

External links

1868 births
1937 deaths
Hawaiian Kingdom people
American people of German descent
Hilo Boarding School alumni
Kamehameha Schools alumni
Oberlin College alumni
Native Hawaiian politicians
Members of the Hawaii Territorial Legislature
20th-century American politicians
Hawaii Democrats
Hawaii Republicans
Educators from Hawaii
University of Hawaiʻi faculty
People from Hawaii (island)
Native Hawaiian sportspeople
Oberlin Yeomen football players
19th-century players of American football
Players of American football from Honolulu
American football guards
American football fullbacks